Miracle in Lane 2, is a 2000 Disney Channel Original Movie starring Frankie Muniz, Rick Rossovich, Molly Hagan, and Patrick Levis. The film is based on the life of Justin Yoder (portrayed by Muniz), who was the first person with a disability to compete in the All American Soapbox Derby.

Plot

Born with spina bifida and hydrocephalus, 12-year-old Justin Yoder uses a wheelchair and lives with his overprotective parents and his athlete brother, Seth (Patrick Levis). Justin is unable to play any sports due to his disability, however, he still is determined to get a trophy of his own. For guidance, he turns to God, who takes form of famous race car driver Bobby Wade (Tuc Watkins), who appears throughout the film.

Justin attempts to try out for summer baseball league; however, he is rejected due to his disability. He enters a chess tournament, but despite being placed in younger category than his actual age due to assumptions about him using a wheelchair, he loses the tournament.

After leaving the tournament disappointed, Justin finds himself at a car show where he sees his neighbor, Vic Sauder (Roger Aaron Brown), who is attending with his vintage red Corvette. Justin assists Vic in winning the contest for best car in exchange for the associated trophy. Vic stops by to deliver the trophy but leaves when he is informed Justin is not there. Justin visits Vic’s home and when there is no response, Justin enters the garage and attempts to retrieve the trophy from a high shelf. The attempt causes the shelf to fall, landing on the prized Corvette, damaging the car.

Justin helps Vic clean the garage as punishment and the two develop a bond, however, Vic does not allow Justin to go near the shed on the property. Despite the warning, when Vic is running errands, Justin looks through the windows of the shed and sees multiple trophies inside. He enters and discovers more awards along with a soapbox racer. He starts a projector that plays a film of a young girl competing in soapbox racer, however, he is caught by Vic who demands that he leaves.

After reconciling with Vic and attending an soapbox race together, Justin, his father, and Vic build a soapbox racer. To accommodate his disability, his father and Vic build a customized handbrake that they name the "Justin Brake”. Meanwhile, Seth feels ignored by his father who consistently misses his baseball games and is revealed to be in therapy during a fight with Justin.

During a race, Justin crashes and is hospitalized due to spinal fluid build up. He is permitted to race in the All American Soapbox Derby after the winning competitor of the penultimate race drops out. On their way to the derby, Vic reveals to Justin that his daughter, Becca, who was also a soapbox racer competitor, died in a swimming accident and his wife died a year afterward. Seth convinces the Rules Committee to allow Justin to compete with a handbrake rather than the regulation foot brake after contacting the media, leading to the brothers' reconciliation. Justin ultimately wins the tournament.

In the final scene, Justin asks God if people are perfect when they go to Heaven. In response, God shows him a vision where there are angels with and without wheelchairs to which he happily replies "Perfect".

As a tribute to Justin, live footage of him is shown before the closing credits.

Cast
 Frankie Muniz as Justin Yoder
 Rick Rossovich as Myron Yoder
 Molly Hagan as Sheila Yoder
 Patrick Levis as Seth Yoder
 Roger Aaron Brown as Vic Sauder
 Tuc Watkins as  God / Bobby Wade
 Brittany Bouck as Cindy
 Todd Hurst as Brad
 Kara Keough as Teresa
 Joel McKinnon Miller as Bill
 Holmes Osbourne as Randall
 Freda Fon Shen as Dr. Kwan
 Christian Copelin as Pipsqueak
 Rick Fitts as Soccer Coach
 Jim Jansen as Minister
 James Lashly as Leather Jacket Man
 Tom Nolan as Baseball Coach
 Milt Tarver as Elder Statesman
 Tom Virtue as The Announcer
 Ethan Cutuli as Racer / Fan

Production
Originally known as Wheelies, the telefilm was in production in March 2000 for a May 2000 Disney Channel premiere.

Awards

Won
 Directors Guild of America, 2001: DGA Award, Outstanding Directorial Achievement in Children's Programs
Greg Beeman (director), Christopher Morgan (unit production manager) (plaque), Lisa C. Satriano (first assistant director) (plaque), Nick Satriano (second assistant director) (plaque)
 Humanitas Prize, 2001 - Children's Live-Action Category, Joel Kauffmann, Donald C. Yost
Young Artist Awards, 2001 - Young Artist Award Best Performance in a TV Movie (Drama), Supporting Young Actor, Patrick Levis

Nominations
 Writers Guild of America, 2001 - WGA Award (TV) Children's Script, Joel Kauffmann, Donald C. Yost
Young Artist Award - Best Family TV Movie/Pilot/Mini-Series - Cable
Young Artist Award - Best Performance in a TV Movie (Drama), Leading Young Actor, Frankie Muniz

References

External links
 

2000 television films
2000 films
2000 comedy-drama films
Disney Channel Original Movie films
American auto racing films
Films about disability in the United States
American comedy television films
Films about paraplegics or quadriplegics
Films directed by Greg Beeman
American drama television films
2000s American films